Afroclanis neavi is a moth of the family Sphingidae. It is known from savanna and woodland from Zimbabwe through Zambia to Tanzania.

The length of the forewings is 24–28 mm for males and 28–30 mm for females. The forewings are brownish purple with a dark triangle at the apex and a dark band from the tornus to the end of the cell. The hindwings are red with a diffuse dark area at the margin near the tornus. The body is bright brownish purple with darker tegulae.

References

Smerinthini
Moths described in 1910
Moths of Sub-Saharan Africa
Lepidoptera of Tanzania
Lepidoptera of Zimbabwe
Lepidoptera of Zambia